William Jolliffe may refer to:

 William Joliffe (1622 – 1712), English merchant and politician
William Jolliffe, 1st Baron Hylton, (1800–1876), known as Sir William Jolliffe, 1st Baronet, between 1821 and 1866, British Conservative Party politician
 William Jolliffe (censor), first Chief Censor of New Zealand
 William Jolliffe (1660-1750), British Member of Parliament for Petersfield, 1734–1741
 William Jolliffe (1745–1802), British Member of Parliament for Petersfield, 1768–1802
 William Sydney Hylton Jolliffe (1841–1912), British Member of Parliament for Petersfield, 1874–1880
 William Jolliffe, 4th Baron Hylton (1898–1967), British peer and soldier

See also 
 Jolliffe